A rat race is an endless, self-defeating pursuit.

Rat race may also refer to:

Film
 The Rat Race, a 1960 film directed by Robert Mulligan starring Tony Curtis and Debbie Reynolds
 Rat Race (film), a 2001 comedy film directed by Jerry Zucker

Music
 Rat Race (Child's Play album), 1990 
 "Rat Race" (Child's Play song), a single from the album
 "Rat Race", a song by Bob Marley & The Wailers from Rastaman Vibration
 "Rat Race" (song), by the UK Subs, contained in their 1980 album Brand New Age
 "Rat Race", a song by The Drifters
 "Rat Race" (The Specials song), a 1980 single included on the 1980 album More Specials
 "Rat Race" (Enter Shikari song)
 "Ratrace" (Skindred song)
 The Rat Race Blues a 1960 jazz album by Gigi Gryce

Other uses
 Rat Race (video game), a cancelled Sony game
 Rat Race (The Price Is Right), a pricing game on the TV show The Price Is Right
 The Rat Race (novel), a 1950 science fiction novel by Jay Franklin
 Who He? a 1953 novel by Alfred Bester also published as The Rat Race.
 Rat-race coupler, a type of radio-frequency coupler